The 1964–65 Swedish Division I season was the 21st season of Swedish Division I. Vastra Frolunda IF won the league title by finishing first in the final round.

First round

Northern Group

Southern Group

Qualification round

Northern Group

Southern Group

Final round

External links
 1964–65 season

Swedish
Swedish Division I seasons
1964–65 in Swedish ice hockey